The Rock Salt & Nails are a Celtic fusion band based in Shetland, Scotland. The band formed in 1992.

In 2009, the band wrote and released a single dedicated to the Scottish tennis player Andy Murray, called "Volley Highway".

Line-up 
2003 line-up:
 Paul Anderson – Fiddle
 John Clark – Bass & Mandolin
 Linda Irvine – Fiddle
 David Jamieson – Drums & Percussion
 Emma Johnston – Fiddle & Vocals
 Fiona Johnston – Piano, Keyboards & Vocals
 Paul Johnston – Guitar, Banjo & Vocals

Discography 
 Rock Salt & Nails (1991), Tape, probably sold in Shetland only but also sold at the Edinburgh Fringe 1991–1992
 Waves (1993)
 More and More (1995)
 Stand Your Ground (1997)
 4 6 2 1 (1999)
 Boxed (1999)
 Midnight Rain (2003)
 Live and Hazardous (live) (2005)
 "Volley Highway" (single) (2009)

References

External links
 Rock Salt and Nails

Scottish folk music groups
Celtic fusion groups
Shetland music
Organisations based in Shetland
1992 establishments in Scotland